Lily Aldrin is a fictional character in the CBS television series How I Met Your Mother. Lily is portrayed by American actress Alyson Hannigan. She is married to Marshall Eriksen and the best friend of Ted Mosby, Robin Scherbatsky and Barney Stinson. Lily is a kindergarten teacher and an amateur painter. In the eighth season, she gets a job as an art consultant. Lily is also the only member of the original main cast of the series who has not appeared in every episode, because Alyson Hannigan took leave after giving birth to her first child.

Casting 
Series creator Craig Thomas explained that he based Marshall and Lily on himself and his wife Rebecca. Rebecca had been upset after learning this, but (as she is a fan of  Buffy the Vampire Slayer) was consoled when Alyson Hannigan was put in the role. Hannigan was looking to do more comedy work after having worked on the American Pie series and was available for the show.

Character overview 
Lily Aldrin, born March 22, 1978, grew up in Park Slope, Brooklyn, New York. She is the  daughter of Janice Aldrin, whom Lily describes as a feminist and who worked two jobs to support the family. The creators stated in commentary that there is no evidence to the contrary that Lily's grandfather is astronaut Buzz Aldrin – and like Buzz Aldrin, her grandfather is said to have fought in the Korean War. Lily's father, Mickey (Chris Elliott), is an unsuccessful board game creator living in his parents' basement. Janice and Mickey divorced when Lily was a child.  Lily is estranged from her father – an absentee parent who she claims "broke my heart every day for 20 years" – until he promises to be there for her following the birth of her son.

During her high school and college years, she was a part of the goth subculture, dying her hair and wearing stereotypical "goth" clothes. She dumped her high school boyfriend, Scooter (David Burtka), on prom night, admitting she only dated him because he looked like Kurt Cobain. He remains obsessed with her for years afterward. She met Marshall during her freshman year at Wesleyan University in 1996 and dated him throughout college.

As of 2010, Lily is 32 years old, meaning she was born circa 1978. According to her résumé, she is fluent in Italian, certified in teaching English as a Second Language, and proficient in Photoshop, Quark, and Java.

Lily frequently states her need for regular sex, saying that if she went without for too long she'd be "out there selling it for a nickel". She has a more than passing sexual interest in other women, suggesting she may be bisexual. In particular, she has confessed several times, albeit in a seemingly joking fashion, that she finds Robin sexually attractive, and that Robin has been the subject of some "confusing dreams". Well aware of Lily's sexual attraction to her, Robin at one point says that she won't go near Lily after she's been drinking martinis, as she is prone to flirt quite strongly with her and even try to get the guys to dare them to make out. Robin tends to alternate between ignoring Lily’s advances and being disturbed by them whenever they show themselves.

Lily is adept at manipulating people and situations to get what she wants; she is especially talented at engineering breakups between couples she knows are not right for each other. Barney calls her a "diabolical puppet master" and "pure evil", while Ted calls her a "psychopath".

Character history 
Lily and Marshall get engaged in the fall of 2005, as portrayed in the series pilot. Towards the end of the first season, she reveals to Robin that she has been having second thoughts about getting married without having experienced much else of life before Marshall. Those doubts intensify, and she acts upon them, applying for a painting fellowship in San Francisco. She is accepted and, after arguing with Marshall on and off – with several pause breaks in between for drinks, dinner at Red Lobster, and sex – Lily finally says that she cannot promise Marshall that she would return to him after the fellowship. They break up, and she goes to San Francisco.

She returns to New York three  months later, and confesses that leaving had been a mistake. She begs Marshall to take her back, but Marshall can't get over his wounded pride, and refuses. They eventually get back together, however, and resume their engagement. They finally get married at the end of the second season.

In the third season, it is revealed that Lily is a shopaholic, and goes shopping whenever something bad happens. She keeps her multiple credit cards in a "box of shame". She and Marshall struggle with her credit card bills, especially when they were about to buy an apartment, which leaves Marshall no choice but to abandon his dreams of being an environmental lawyer and take a job at a big corporate firm. They eventually get the house, only to find out that the neighborhood is situated near a water sewage treatment plant and that the floor of their apartment is crooked.

Lily, along with Ted and Marshall, occasionally indulges in "sandwiches" (Future Ted's euphemism for marijuana) during college and at their 20th college reunion.

Out of all of the characters, she is the only one Barney chooses to confide in when he realizes that he is in love with Robin. In the fifth season, Lily forces Robin and Barney to confess to being a couple. She does this by detaching the doorknob of Robin's room at the apartment and waits for them to have "the talk". Robin and Barney pass a few notes under the door with vague explanations, none of which satisfy her. To convince Lily to let them out, they lie about being boyfriend and girlfriend, but after they leave the apartment hand-in-hand, Lily tells Ted "they didn't realize they weren't lying."

Lily and Marshall are both ecstatic to have another couple to hang out with. They invite Robin and Barney for an evening together, which goes awry; Lily and Marshall become clingy and dependent, prompting Barney and Robin to "break up" with them. Eventually, Barney and Robin realize they miss Lily and Marshall, and they all profess their desire to be a foursome. When Barney and Robin's relationship starts to falter, Lily "comes out of retirement" to break them up. She executes an elaborate plan to get them into a big argument; this fails, but they finally realize they don't work as a couple.

The group discovers that Lily has a doppelgänger named Jasmine, a Russian stripper. Lily is especially excited about this, and is so enthralled by her stripper twin that she and Marshall get a private dance. At the end of the night, Lily switches place with Jasmine and dances with much difficulty on stage, eventually falling into the crowd, to Marshall's horror.

Throughout the sixth season, Marshall and Lily try to get pregnant. Their first attempts are unsuccessful, however, and they worry that they will not be able to conceive. In the season finale, Lily finally gets pregnant. At the end of the seventh season, she gives birth to a son, Marvin.

In the eighth season, Lily takes a job as an art consultant to a millionaire called "The Captain", who eventually offers to move her to Italy. She turns the promotion down, however, as it conflicts with Marshall's job as an environmental lawyer. Marshall convinces her to take it, however, and the two prepare to move to Rome.  In the season finale, Marshall accepts a judgeship without telling her, putting her plans in jeopardy.

During the final season, set during the weekend of Barney and Robin's wedding, Lily learns of Marshall's new job, and they get into a huge fight. She storms out, but returns and reconciles with Marshall upon learning that she is pregnant. Marshall turns the job down, and agrees to go to Italy with her. A flash forward  scene reveals that Lily gives birth to a girl, Daisy.

On the day of the wedding, Lily and Marshall renew their vows to each other.

The series finale, "Last Forever", reveals that, a few years later, Lily gives birth to a third child, a baby girl whose name is unknown. Even as the group drifts apart over the years, Lily is there for all the important moments of their lives: Robin and Barney's divorce, the birth of Barney's daughter and that of Ted's two children, and Ted's wedding to The Mother (whose real name is Tracy McConnell). She remains happily married to Marshall, who eventually becomes a State Supreme Court judge.

Reception 
Alyson Hannigan won the People's Choice Award for Favorite TV Comedy Actress in 2010 and 2012 for this role.

References 

How I Met Your Mother characters
Fictional painters
Television characters introduced in 2005
Fictional schoolteachers
Fictional characters from Brooklyn
American female characters in television